Scott Mitchell may refer to:

Sports
Scott Mitchell (darts player) (born 1970), English darts player
Scott Mitchell (footballer) (born 1985), English footballer
Scott Mitchell (offensive lineman) (born 1989), offensive lineman in the CFL
Scott Mitchell (quarterback) (born 1968), former quarterback
Scott Mitchell (wide receiver) (born 1983), wide receiver who played various types of North American football
Scott Mitchell, president of the Hamilton Tiger-Cats

Others
Scott A. Mitchell, applied mathematician
Scott Mitchell (Buddhist scholar)
Captain Scott Mitchell, a fictional character in Tom Clancy's Ghost Recon video game series